Tulasi Apa is a 2017 first Odia biographical film, produced by Anupam Patnaik and directed by Amiya Patnaik. The film depicts the life of Tulasi Munda, an educator and social activist from Keonjhar, Odisha. The film was released on 19 May 2017.

The film introduces Barsha Nayak as the main protagonist. The film has been critically acclaimed and won numerous awards including Six Odisha State awards in 2015. It was officially selected in Bengaluru, Kolkata, Tehran and other film festivals. Barsha Nayak got the best actress award in Haryana Film festival. The film also won the best film award in Shimla Film Festival.

Plot 
Born and brought up in a tribal region of Odisha, 'Padmashri' Tulasi Munda did not allow the poverty, illiteracy and un-development of her locality to dishearten her, discourage her or dampen her spirit. She took a humble step to educate her fellow beings, which grew into a huge movement. Be it urban-rural divide or conflict of mines-owner and workers or exploitation of the have-nots by the haves, Tulasi Munda protested each and every act of injustice and discrimination and turned the tide in favour of her fellow beings.

The film encapsulates the essence of Tulasi Munda's life. It enumerates her struggle and highlights her achievements.

Cast 
Barsha Nayak as Tulasi Munda
Madhusmita as young Tulasi Munda
Sujit Paikray as Sahrai Oram
Mamata Panda as Janha
Lochani Bag as Ghasa Munda, Tulasi Munda's Mother
Premanjan Parida as Tulasi Munda's Father
Netrananda Barik as Tulasi Munda's Uncle
Kanakalata Das as Tulasi Munda's Aunty
Kajal Satpathy as Jhingi
Debananda Sony as Jhingi's Husband
Susil Mishra as Nabakrishna Chaudary

Production 
The research started on 2014 November by Abha Rani Bal. She was a primary school teacher in Barbil. She used to travel every week to Serenda, Tulasi Munda's home to meet her and get the story from her. After months of meetings, discussions and research the script was formed by the end of 2014. Barsha Nayak, who portrays the lead character was shortlisted from some auditions. She had to travel from Hyderabad to Bhubaneswar frequently for the shooting as she was working in an IT company in Hyderabad. The workshop started in Bhubaneswar in January 2015, followed by the shooting in February first week. The entire schedule was completed in 30 days.

The film is shot in and around Keonjhar, Joda and Barbil all mining areas, and original locations where Tulasi Munda had grown up and spent her entire childhood.

According to the director the most difficult part, as it was with biopic Tulasi Apa is that one cannot take cinematic liberties. Most of the time people are sure, that while making a biopic, you will end up making a documentary if you are going to be inflexible. How to dramatise a person's life, without making it look like a documentary – that was the challenge. 'And when you end up doing it correctly, I think it's a tremendous achievement' said Amiya Patnaik.

Tulasi Apa is a biopic with a difference. The woman herself is different. She stands out in the crowd yet does not. Generally, when we deal with biopics we deal with a full life. But in Tulasi Apa, the director concentrated on her activism spans more than four decades of representation for the voiceless. How she became the symbol of tribal and women empowerment? That's what makes it different.

Music 
The music for Tulasi Apa has been composed by Pankaj Jal, and the lyrics has been penned down Nimai Mohanty. The music rights of the film has been acquired by Eastern Media Entertainment.

Release

Festival Screening 
Tulsi Apa premiered in the 21st Kolkata International Film Festival in 2015. It was also screened at 4th Tehran Jasmine International Film Festival, the first Odia film to be screen there. It has won best feature film in 2nd International Film Festival of Shimla. It was also screened at Nashik International Film Festival, the Bengaluru International Film Festival and the 1st Haryana International Film Festival.

Theatre Release 
Tulasi Apa is slated to hit the theatres on 19 May 2017 at several single theatres across India.

Streaming release 
Tulasi Apa was released on Amazon Prime videos in November 2019. It is the first Odia language movie to be released on Amazon Prime videos worldwide.

Accolades

References 

2015 films
Indian biographical films
2010s Odia-language films